The Electoral district of Gisborne was an electoral district of the Victorian Legislative Assembly. It was created in 1967 and abolished in 2002.

A notable member was Athol Guy, of the folk/pop group The Seekers.

Members

 = by-election
 = resigned

Election results

See also
 Parliaments of the Australian states and territories
 List of members of the Victorian Legislative Assembly

References

Former electoral districts of Victoria (Australia)
1967 establishments in Australia
2002 disestablishments in Australia